Carrie Cunningham (born April 28, 1972) is an American former professional tennis player who played on the Women's Tennis Association (WTA) Circuit from 1987 until 1994. She comes from the state of Michigan, United States.

Career singles highlights 

Cunningham's career highlights include a world ranking of 32 in 1991, ending the year with a rank of 51 after reaching the third rounds of both the Australian and French Opens.

Her best Grand Slam performance was attaining the 4th round (round of 16) at the 1992 US Open, losing to eventual semi-finalist Manuela Maleeva-Fragniere, 6–3, 7–5.  She reached the second round in Wimbledon from 1989-1991.  She also holds one Grand Slam Junior title - the US Junior Open Championship in 1988.

Doubles highlights 

Cunningham was also on the doubles circuit, reaching one WTA final - the 1991 Tokyo International, with doubles partner Laura Gildemeister, losing 6–3, 6–3 to the team of Pam Shriver and Mary Joe Fernandez.  She does hold a USTA Girls’ 18 National Championship doubles title, when she teamed with Andrea Farley to capture the 1988 crown on clay courts.

Court habits and influence 

Cunningham had a habit of sometimes grunting during her play.  In fact, former world #1 Monica Seles cites Cunningham for starting her own grunting habit, after Seles lost a finals match to Cunningham in 1986.  Said Seles, "it has been part of me since I was 12 when I played Carrie Cunningham in one of the finals and I started doing that. Since then, it has been always with me each year at Wimbledon."

Earnings 

Cunningham's career earnings on the professional tour totaled $318,541.

Post career 

Carrie pursued a career in medicine and surgery. She is on the faculty of Harvard Medical School and an attending surgeon under the name Carrie C. Lubitz, M.D., at the Massachusetts General Hospital in Boston, Massachusetts.  She graduated from University of Michigan and Harvard School of Public Health.

Career finals

Doubles (0–1)

References

External links
 
 
 Link to physician profile at Massachusetts General Hospital website

1972 births
Living people
US Open (tennis) junior champions
American female tennis players
Grand Slam (tennis) champions in girls' singles
Tennis people from Michigan
University of Michigan alumni
Harvard School of Public Health alumni
21st-century American women